Defensin, alpha 6 (DEFA6) also known as human alpha defensin 6  (HD6) is a human protein that is encoded by the DEFA6 gene.  DEFA6 is expressed in the Paneth cells of the ileum.

Function 

The alpha defensins are a family of microbicidal and cytotoxic peptides that defend the host against bacteria and viruses.  HD6 has poor antibacterial potency.  However, HD6 affords protection against invasion by enteric bacterial pathogens by self-assembly to form fibrils and nanonets that surround and entangle bacteria.

Several alpha defensin genes, including DEFA6, are clustered on chromosome 8.

References

Further reading

External links 
 PDBe-KB provides an overview of all the structure information available in the PDB for Human Defensin-6

Defensins